Kyle C. Sieg (born April 16, 2001) is an American professional stock car racing driver. He competes full-time in the NASCAR Xfinity Series, driving the No. 28 Ford Mustang for RSS Racing. He is the youngest son of RSS team owner Rod Sieg and brother of current driver Ryan Sieg and the late Shane Sieg.

Racing career

Early career

NASCAR and ARCA

In 2020, Sieg made his ARCA Menards Series debut for Cook-Finley Racing in the No. 42 Chevrolet in the race at IRP and finished 10th. The next month, he made his debut in the ARCA Menards Series East, finishing 11th in the race at Dover in Cook-Finley's No. 41 car. He then ran the main ARCA Series/East Series combination race at Bristol, finishing 17th.

In 2021, it was announced that he would run the first 4 races of the season with hopes of a full season in the No. 28 for his family team, RSS Racing. In those first 4 races, Sieg would finish in the top-10 in all of them, including 2 top-5's at Phoenix and Talladega. On May 12, it was announced that Sieg would make his debut in the Xfinity Series in the race at Dover in the No. 90 for DGM Racing in a partnership with RSS Racing. Sieg finished 34th after blowing a tire late in the race. That same weekend, he entered the East Series race at Dover for the second year in a row, finishing 13th in the RSS No. 28. In 2022 he competed part-time for RSS Racing's No.28, 38, and 39 Ford Mustangs, he would also compete for Rookie of the year honors. At the Wawa 250 at Daytona, Sieg finished 10th earning his career best finish.

On February 1, 2023, RSS Racing announced that Kyle would drive full-time in the No. 28 for the 2023 season.

Motorsports career results

Stock car career summary

NASCAR
(key) (Bold – Pole position awarded by qualifying time. Italics – Pole position earned by points standings or practice time. * – Most laps led.)

Xfinity Series

ARCA Menards Series
(key) (Bold – Pole position awarded by qualifying time. Italics – Pole position earned by points standings or practice time. * – Most laps led.)

ARCA Menards Series East

ARCA Menards Series West

 Season still in progress

References

External links
 

2001 births
NASCAR drivers
ARCA Menards Series drivers
Living people
People from Tucker, Georgia
Racing drivers from Atlanta
Racing drivers from Georgia (U.S. state)